Herman Valentiner (8 May 1850 – 17 September 1913) was a Danish mathematician who introduced the Valentiner group in 1889.

Valentiner earned his Ph.D. in 1881 from the University of Copenhagen with a thesis on space curves, and took a teaching position. However, soon afterwards he moved to a Danish life insurance company.

References

Further reading

External links

Danish mathematicians
1850 births
1913 deaths